Stewart the Rat is a graphic novel written by Steve Gerber, penciled by Gene Colan, and inked by Tom Palmer. It was published in November 1980 by Eclipse Enterprises. Stewart the Rat was reprinted in January 2003 by About Comics.

References 

1980 graphic novels
1980 comics debuts
American graphic novels
Comics by Steve Gerber
Comics about animals
Comics about mice and rats
Anthropomorphic mice and rats
Fictional mice and rats
Comics characters introduced in 1980
Male characters in comics